Frederiksdal is a country house on the Furesø Lake north of Copenhagen,  Denmark.

History

Origins
Hjortholm Mill, a copper mill, was built at the site in 1650. The site was acquired by Frederick III in 1668, renaming it Frederiksdal (Frederick's Valley). The king had plans to build a large maison de plaisance in the grounds but died in 1670 and his son Christian V abandoned the project. Frederick IV ceded the estate to his sister, Princess Sophia Hedwig, who began the construction of a house on the land which for unknown reasons bore a striking resemblance with Ørholm Manor on the island of Funen, but it was never completed.

The current house

The town of Bagsværd was separated from the Frederiksdal estate in 1735, and in 1739 Frederiksdal was put at the disposal of Johan Sigismund Schulin, a close friend of the royal family who had been ennobled by the crown and received a number of prominent appointments since Christian VI's ascend to the throne in 1730. On 30 December 1743, Schulin was granted the property from the king as a New Year present. He charged royal architect Niels Eigtved with the design of a summer residence which was completed in 1747. Schulin was created Count in 1750 but died later that same year.

Schulin's eldest son, Frederik Ludvig Schulin. was only two years old when his father died. The estate was therefore managed by his mother, Catarine Marie Schulin (née von Møsting), who carried out alterations on the building in 1752 and 1753 with the assistance of the architect Johann Gottfried Rosenberg. During her tenure the naturalist Otto Friedrich Müller made and published the observations of protists and flora found on the estate that made his reputation. She was later involved in a love affair with the exiled Swedish count Adolph Ribbing who later continued to Paris.

The grown-up Frederik Ludvig Schulin has been described as lazy, incompetent and dissolute and it has therefore been speculated that Frederiksdal only remained in the hands of the Schulin family as a result of his early death in 1781.

Frederik Ludvig Schulin's son, Sigismund Schulin, was only three years old when his father died. The Frederiksdal estate was therefore managed by his mother until 1808.

Sigismund Schulin was intended for a career as a civil servant at the royal court in Copenhagen but it ended when he was accused of high treason in  1807-08.

Architecture

Frederiksdal is credited with being the earliest example of a maison de plaisance in Denmark. It stands in white-dressed masonry with sandstone decorations above the windows and two corner risalits on the main facade. The house originally had a hipped roof while the mansard roof is the result of alterations carried out by Johann Gottfried Rosenberg between 1752 and 1753.

The interior features a combination of large and small rooms symmetrically arranged around the main axis' vestibule and conservatory. There are rich Rococo stucco decorations, particularly in the Garden Hall, executed by Carlo Enrico Brenno and Giovanni-Battista Fossati.

Frederiksdal today
The property is currently owned by the eighth generation of the Schulin family. The main building plays host to an annual series of classical concerts.

The estate covers  328 hectares of land of which circa 200 hectares are forest.

List of owners
 (1668-1670) The Crown
(1670-1714) Queen Charlotte Amalie
 (1714-1716) The Crown
 (1716-1735) Princess Sophie Hedevig
 (1735-1739) The Crown
 (1747-1750) Johan Sigismund Schulin
 (1750-1781) Frederik Ludvig Schulin
 (1781-1808) Sophie Hedevig von Schulin (née Warnstedt)
 (1808-1836) Sigismund Schulin
 (1836-1880) Johan Sigismund Schulin
 (1880-1929) Sigismund Ludvig Schulin
 (1929-1968) Sigismund lensgreve Schulin
 (1968-1970) Johanne Amalie Schulin (née Schou)
 (1970-1992) Johan Sigismund Vilhelm Schulin
 (1992 - 2016) Karen Vibeke Østergaard, gift Schulin
 (2016 - ) Carl Christian Sigismund Ahlefeldt Laurvig

References

Further reading
 Hjorth, Karen: Slottet og slægten - Familien Schulin på Frederiksdal 1740-1840. Jepsen & Co. (189 pages)

External links

 Official website
 Spirce
 Source
 Source
 Source

Houses in Lyngby-Taarbæk Municipality
Listed buildings and structures in Lyngby-Taarbæk Municipality
Listed residential buildings in Copenhagen
Houses completed in 1745
Baroque architecture in Copenhagen
1747 establishments in Denmark